Jean-François Bonnard (born 14 September 1971) is a French former ice hockey defenceman. He competed in the men's tournament at the 2002 Winter Olympics.

References

External links

1971 births
Living people
Brûleurs de Loups players
French ice hockey defencemen
Ice hockey players at the 2002 Winter Olympics
Olympic ice hockey players of France
Ours de Villard-de-Lans players
Sportspeople from Grenoble